Tobias Leenaert (born 3 August 1973) is a Belgian vegan activist, author, speaker and educator. He co-founded the Center for Effective Vegan Advocacy (CEVA) with Melanie Joy, as well as ProVeg International and Ethical Vegetarian Alternative (EVA). Leenaert is the originator of Thursday Veggie Day in Ghent, which was launched in 2009. He is the author of the 2017 book How to Create a Vegan World: A Pragmatic Approach and the blog The Vegan Strategist. Leenaert identifies as an effective altruist.

Activism 
Leenaert advocates for a pragmatic approach to vegan activism, which doesn't rely on solely moral arguments. His methods of advocacy has drawn criticism from abolitionist animal rights advocates, such as Roger Yates.

Leenaert has also written and spoken about wild-animal suffering, which he considers as important as suffering of non-wild animals.

Leenaert give lectures and workshops on vegan advocacy around the world.

References

External links 
 
 How to Create a Vegan World? – Tobias Leenaert [IARC2017]

1973 births
Living people
21st-century Belgian educators
21st-century Belgian writers
Animal rights activists
Belgian activists
Ghent University alumni
Organization founders
Veganism activists